Moldjord or Moldjorda is the administrative centre of the municipality of Beiarn in Nordland county, Norway. The village is home to the Beiarn Church, the main church for the municipality. The village has about 150 residents (in 2016).

Climate
Climate type is dominated by the winter season, a long, bitterly cold period with short, clear days, relatively little precipitation mostly in the form of snow, and low humidity.  The Köppen Climate Classification subtype for this climate is "Dfc" (Continental Subarctic Climate).

References

External links
Moldjord, kommunesenter i Beiarn kommune 
Service facilities in Beiarn

Beiarn
Villages in Nordland
Populated places of Arctic Norway